Hooglede is a municipality located in the Belgian province of West Flanders. On January 1, 2006, Hooglede had a total population of 9,831. The total area is 37.84 km² which gives a population density of 260 inhabitants per km².

Hooglede-Gits was the site of the 2007 UCI Cyclo-cross World Championships. 
Hooglede houses one of the 4 German War Cemeteries in Belgium, the Hooglede German War Cemetery.

Economy
The Deceuninck company is based in Hooglede, as is MOL Trucks.

Politics
From 1989 till 2012, politics in Hooglede were dominated by the cartel SAMEN (consisting of sp.a, N-VA and Open Vld). In 2012, the cooperation within SAMEN was stopped. The new municipality consists of N-VA Plus (10 seats), CD&V (7 seats), Open Vld (2 seats) and Samen Sterk (2 seats). Mayor is Rita Demaré (CD&V).

References

External links

 

 
Municipalities of West Flanders